Every Time I Die is a 2019 American thriller film directed by Robi Michael, and written by Michael and Gal Katzir. It stars Drew Fonteiro, Marc Menchaca, Michelle Macedo, Tyler White and Melissa Macedo.

The film had its world premiere at the Cinequest Film & Creativity Festival on March 8, 2019. The film was released on August 9, 2019.

Synopsis
The film follows the story of a man, who after being murdered, finds his consciousness transferred to the bodies of his friends and tries to warn and protect them from the killer who previously murdered him at a remote lake.

Cast
 Drew Fonteiro as Sam
 Marc Menchaca as Jay
 Michelle Macedo as Poppy
 Tyler White as Tyler
 Melissa Macedo as Mia

Release
The film was released on August 9, 2019.

Reception

References

External links 

2019 films
2019 thriller films
American thriller films
American independent films
2019 independent films
2010s English-language films
2010s American films